Mayor of Morristown, New Jersey

Donald Cresitello, 2006 to 2010
David Manahan, 1986 to 1989
Emilio J. Gervasio 1982 to 1986
Donald Cresitello, 1977 to 1981
David Manahan, 1974 to 1977
John Bickford, 1963.
 William Parsons Todd, 1953–1954.
Clyde W. Potts (1876–1950), 1921 to 1934. He was born on November 1, 1876 in Libertyville, Iowa. He died on May 19, 1950.
Theodore Ayers, 1909-1910
Thomas W. Cauldwell, 1908-1909 (Died)
Alexander Bennell, 1906-1907
Rev. Dr. Norman Fox, 1902
Edward Quayle 1894, 1896, 1898 (Mayor during Spanish–American War)
James Sullivan (1837-1899), was born about 1837. Democrat. Grocer; mayor of Morristown, N.J.. Baptist. Member, Freemasons. Died May 9, 1899 
George Theodore Werts, (1846–1910) 1886 - 1892.
Henry W. Miller, 1880 - 1881
Theodore Ayers, 1876 - 1879
Alfred Mills, 1874 - 1875
Joseph W. Ballentine, 1872 - 1873
Samuel S. Halsey, 1870 - 1871
George Thomas Cobb, (1813–1870) 1865 - 1869
John Edwards Taylor, (1834 – November 23, 1914).

References

Morristown, New Jersey
 
Morristown